Bouygues S.A. is a French industrial group headquartered in the 8th arrondissement of Paris, France. Bouygues is listed on the Euronext Paris exchange and is a blue chip in the CAC 40 stock market index. The company was founded in 1952 by Francis Bouygues and has been led by his son Martin Bouygues since 1989.

The group specialises in construction (Colas Group and Bouygues Construction), real estate development (Bouygues Immobilier), media (TF1 Group), telecommunications (Bouygues Telecom).

History
The company was founded by Francis Bouygues in 1952. In 1970 Bouygues became listed on the Paris Stock Exchange. In 1985 and 1986 Bouygues acquired road construction groups Screg, Sacer and Colas; later reorganised as Colas Group. In 1987 the company started operating the television channel TF1 and in 1988 Bouygues moved into its new head office, the Challenger complex, in Saint-Quentin en Yvelines. In 1996 the company launched Bouygues Télécom and in 2006 the company acquired 23.26% of Alstom. In 2010, through its subsidiary Nerem Telecom, Bouygues also acquired HGT Telecom for $170 million from Henri Benezra and his brother Avi.

In 2014, consecutively to Alstom's cession of its Energy activities to General Electric, Bouygues granted a call option to the French government allowing it to acquire a maximum of 20% of Alstom, currently owned by the group. In May 2018, the company purchased the Australian construction company A. W. Edwards.

In 2021, Bouygues acquired the technical services business, Equans, from Engie in a transaction worth €7.1bn.

Business structure

The company carries out the following businesses:

Construction
 Bouygues Construction (100% share): construction, public works, energy & services, with a presence in 80 countries worldwide
 Colas Group (96.8% share): roadworks, construction, railways and maintenance
 Bouygues Immobilier (100% share): residential, corporate, commercial and hotel real estate and urban development, property development

Telecoms - Media
 Bouygues Télécom (90,5% share): mobile phone and fixed line operator
 TF1 Group (43.7% share): audiovisual group; with TF1 and 9 other TV channels.

Transportation
 Alstom (0.16% share): passenger transportation, signalling and locomotives

Technical services
 Equans

Financial data

Source : Bouygues''

Major construction projects
Bouygues has been involved in many major construction projects including

Europe
 The Parc des Princes completed in 1972 
 The Tour First in 1974
 The Musée d'Orsay completed in 1986
 The Île de Ré bridge completed in 1988 
 The Grande Arche completed in 1989
 The Channel Tunnel completed in 1994
 The Bibliothèque nationale de France completed in 1995  
 The Pont de Normandie completed in 1995,
 The Stade de France completed in 1998
 The expansion of Barnet Hospital completed in 2002
 The redevelopment of West Middlesex University Hospital completed in 2003
 The Brent Emergency Care and Diagnostic Centre completed in 2006
 The expansion of Broomfield Hospital in Chelmsford completed in 2010
 The expansion of North Middlesex University Hospital completed in 2010

Bouygues is also involved in HS2 lot C1, working as part of joint venture, due to complete in 2031.

Africa
 The Hassan II Mosque in Casablanca, Morocco completed in 1992
 The Henri Konan Bédié Bridge in Abidjan, Ivory Coast completed in 2014

North America
  The company also built the Port of Miami Tunnel completed in 2014.
 Construction of the Iqaluit Airport terminal in Nunavut, Canada, completed in 2017.

Asia
 The Gypjak Mosque in Turkmenistan, completed in 2004.
 The Singapore Sports Hub completed in 2014
 LRT Line 1 Cavite Extension due to be completed in 2025

Head office

The Bouygues head office is located at 32 Avenue Hoche in the 8th arrondissement of Paris. The American architect Kevin Roche worked on this building, as well as the previous head office location, the Challenger complex in Saint-Quentin-en-Yvelines. This complex, situated in a  tract in Guyancourt, is now occupied by Bouygues Construction, one of the group's subsidiaries.

Group and values

Social and environmental commitment
Since 2006, Bouygues has participated in the United Nations Global Compact. The group sponsors The Shift Project think tank, with several other companies such as EDF, BNP Paribas or Saint-Gobain, which promotes sustainable economic development.

Patronage
Bouygues focuses its patronage on education, social issues and medical research. Each subsidiary supports its own foundation:
 The Francis Bouygues Foundation sponsors deserving high school students with a scholarship.
 Terre Plurielle, Bouygues Construction's foundation, grants financial support to projects selected by employees. These projects concern access to health, education, and the social insertion of people facing major difficulties.
 The Bouygues Immobilier Corporate Foundation created in 2009 aims at raising awareness about the need of sustainable construction and urban planning.
 The Colas Foundation supports contemporary arts through the acquisition of paintings.
 The TF1 Foundation helps young talents from underprivileged neighbourhoods to succeed in the broadcasting sector.
 The Bouygues Telecom Foundation is committed to environmental protection, helping people in social or medical difficulty, and promoting the French language.

Controversies

Flamanville
Between 2009 and 2011, Bouygues S.A. was illegally employing workers from Poland and Romania exposing them to inhuman working conditions at the construction site of the Flamanville nuclear power plant in Normandy. The company was later condemned for their practices before the court in Cherbourg and was ordered to pay sanctions of between €25,000 and €29,950.

Cyberattack on Bouygues Construction SA
On 30 January 2020 a ransomware-type virus was detected on Bouygues Construction's computer network although operational activity on the construction sites was disrupted. The "Maze Ransomware Gang" claimed responsibility for the attack and posted a 1.2 GB file that allegedly contained data taken from Bouygues Construction.

Notes

References

Further reading
 
 Chronicles of Turkmenistan – The Opposition Website  (English)
 Gundogar – For Democracy and Human Rights in Turkmenistan.

External links

 
 Bouygues Telecom (fr)
 Bouygues Construction (fr)
  Colas (en)
 Offizieller TF1 (en)

 
Conglomerate companies of France
Multinational companies headquartered in France
Companies based in Paris
Conglomerate companies established in 1952
Construction and civil engineering companies established in 1952
French business families
CAC 40
Companies listed on Euronext Paris
French companies established in 1952
Construction and civil engineering companies of France